The Union Interlinguiste de France (UIF: Interlinguistic Union of France), established in 1961, works to increase public knowledge and active use of Interlingua. It produces the magazine Unir, written in French and Interlingua and also established in 1961.  In addition, the UIF makes other Interlingua publications available, arranges conferences and a General Assembly, submits articles to the mainstream press, and issues press releases. In 2007, the UIF was instrumental in gaining recognition of the Union Mundial pro Interlingua as an international organization.

External links
 Union Interlinguiste de France
 Union Mundial pro Interlingua
 Portrait del organisationes de interlingua

References 

France